Mauring (or Moringus) (died 824) was a Frankish nobleman, the son of Suppo I of the Supponids. He succeeded his father in Brescia as count (Brixiae comes) in 822 and, following the brief reign of Adelard, in Spoleto as duke in August 824. According to the Annales of Einhard and the Royal Frankish Annals, he died within a few days of his succession.

References

Sources
Wickham, Chris. Early Medieval Italy: Central Power and Local Society 400-1000. MacMillan Press: 1981.

824 deaths
9th-century dukes of Spoleto
Supponid dynasty
Year of birth unknown